Kendrick may refer to:

Kendrick (name), including a list of people with the surname or given name

Places

United States
Kendrick, Florida
Kendrick, Idaho
Kendrick, Oklahoma

Schools
Kendrick School, in Reading, Berkshire, England, United Kingdom
Reading School (Kendrick Boys School), in Reading, Berkshire, England, United Kingdom

See also
Kindrick (disambiguation)